John Paul Loviglio (born May 30, 1956) is an American former professional baseball second baseman who played for the Philadelphia Phillies (1980), Chicago White Sox (1981–82), and Chicago Cubs (1983). After his playing days, he began a minor league coaching/managing career.

Sources

1956 births
Living people
American expatriate baseball players in Canada
Auburn Phillies players
Baseball coaches from New York (state)
Baseball players from New York (state)
Chicago Cubs players
Chicago White Sox players
Edmonton Trappers players
Iowa Cubs players
Major League Baseball designated hitters
Major League Baseball second basemen
Major League Baseball third basemen
Midland Cubs players
Minor league baseball coaches
Minor league baseball managers
Oklahoma City 89ers players
Peninsula Pilots players
Philadelphia Phillies players
Reading Phillies players
Spartanburg Phillies players